Temperate South America is a biogeographic region of the Earth's seas, comprising the temperate and subtropical waters of South America, including both the Pacific and Atlantic coasts of the continent and adjacent islands. It also includes the remote Gough Island and Tristan da Cunha in the South Atlantic Ocean.

Temperate Southern Africa is a marine realm, one of the great biogeographic divisions of the world's ocean basins.

On the Atlantic coast, Temperate South America transitions to the Tropical Atlantic marine realm  near Rio de Janeiro in Brazil. On the Pacific coast, it extends to Punta Aguja in northern Peru, where it transitions to the Tropical Eastern Pacific realm. To the south lies the Southern Ocean.

The Atlantic coast is influenced by the Brazil Current, which carries warm tropical waters south along the coast. On the Pacific coast, the cold Humboldt Current carries cold Antarctic waters north towards the tropics.

Subdivisions
The Temperate South America realm is divided into five marine provinces. The three larger provinces are composed of smaller ecoregions.

 Warm Temperate Southeastern Pacific
 Central Peru
 Humboldtian
 Central Chile
 Araucanian
 Juan Fernandez and Desventuradas
 Juan Fernandez Islands and Desventuradas Islands 

Despite their geographical proximity to the South American coast, these islands have also been included in the Oceanian realm, due to strong Hawaiian and southeast Polynesian biogeographic influences and the presence of an endemic insect and plant family.
 Warm Temperate Southwestern Atlantic
 Southeastern Brazil
 Rio Grande
 Rio de la Plata
 Uruguay-Buenos Aires Shelf
 Magellanic
 North Patagonian Gulfs
 Patagonian Shelf
 Falkland Islands
 Channels and Fjords of Southern Chile
 Chiloense
 Tristan Gough
 Tristan da Cunha and Gough Island

References

 
Marine realms
Atlantic Ocean
Pacific Ocean